PF may refer to:

Arts and entertainment
 Pianoforte, full original name of the piano instrument
 Project Fanboy, a comic book news website

Businesses
 PF Flyers, a brand of shoes
 Palestinian Airlines (IATA airline designator), a defunct airline
 Pell Frischmann, a multi-disciplinary engineering consultancy

Economics and finance
 Point and figure chart in the technical analysis of securities
 Pfennig, a unit of currency formerly used in Germany, symbol ₰
 Provident Fund (disambiguation), name of various pension funds

Language
 Phonetic form, a level of syntactic representation in linguistics
 Voiceless labiodental affricate (⟨p̪͡f⟩, ⟨p̪͜f⟩, or ⟨p̪f⟩), a type of consonant sound
 Pf (digraph), a German digraph

People
 Phineas Flynn

Organizations 
 Pheasants Forever, a non-profit habitat conservation organization
 Federal Police (Polícia Federal), in Brazil
 Patients' Front, a late 1960s to early 1970s West German pro-illness movement
 South Vietnamese Popular Force, a local defense militia formed by South Vietnam during the Vietnam War
 Patriotic Front (disambiguation), name of a political party in several countries

Places 
 Paracel Islands, FIPS PUB 10-4 territory code
 French Polynesia (Polynésie française), by ISO 3166 code
 .pf, internet country code for French Polynesia
 Pforzheim and Enzkreis district, Germany (vehicle plate code PF)

Science and technology

Computing 
 .pf, internet country code for French Polynesia
 PF (firewall), OpenBSD's stateful packet filter
 PF keys, a type of function keys on old keyboards
 Page fault, a type of exception (error) in computer programming
 Page file, a file used as an extension for computer memory

Physics 
 Power factor, or cos phi, of an AC electric power system
 Purple fringing, a type of chromatic aberration in photography
 Phenol formaldehyde resin, the earliest synthetic polymer
 Picofarad (pF) or petafarad (PF), multiples of farad, the SI unit of electric capacitance
 Photon Factory, a synchrotron located at KEK in Tsukuba, Japan

In other sciences and mathematics 
 pf(A), the Pfaffian of a matrix A
 Phenylphosphine, an organophosphorus compound
 Plasmodium falciparum, a species of Plasmodium that causes malaria in humans
 Polar front, in meteorology 
 Position fix, a position derived from measuring external reference points
 Psychometric function, an inferential psychometric model

Sports 
 Personal foul (disambiguation), a type of foul in several sports
 Power forward (disambiguation), a type of position in several sports

Other uses 
PF, the United States Navy hull classification symbol for patrol frigate
Peregrine Falcons Squad, a faction in the Metal Slug series of video games
 Pilot flying, in commercial aviation, a designation for the pilot in control of an aircraft
 Pour féliciter, text on New Year card
 Procurator fiscal, the public prosecutor in Scotland
 Public forum debate, a debate sanctioned by the National Forensic League
 Pekoe Fannings, a grade of tea leaves
 Horowitz index (PF), blood oxygenation

See also 
 PF1 (disambiguation)